The Ponte Girevole is a swing bridge in Taranto, Italy, spanning the navigation canal between Taranto's Mar Grande and the Mar Piccolo. The bridge connects Borgo Antico (Old Town) island to the Borgo Nuovo (new Town) peninsula. The canal was excavated in 1481 as part of the defenses of Taranto. A steel and wood bridge was first built across the canal in 1886. The present steel bridge was built in 1958. Officially titled the Ponte di San Francesco di Paola, the bridge has two swing spans that pivot near the banks of the canal to meet in the middle of the canal. When open, the halves are parallel to the embankment, leaving the width of the canal clear for passage. The bridge is a Taranto landmark.

The first bridge was hydraulically operated using water stored in the Castello Aragonese. The 1958 replacement was designed by the National Society of Savigliano and built in the former Tosi shipyard in Taranto. It was inaugurated on 10 March 1958 by Italian president Giovanni Gronchi. The new bridge is electrically operated from control stations on each embankment. The sequence of operation requires the Old Town span to open to 45 degrees first, then  the New Town span opens 90 degrees, and finally the Old Town span opens to its full 90 degrees.

References

External links

 Ponte di Girevole at the Comune di Taranto

Swing bridges
Bridges in Italy
Taranto